Grown Up , is the third studio album by Singaporean duo, By2. It was released on April 9, 2010 and contains 11 songs.

Background
The album, which was released one month after By2's 18th birthday, follows the concept of them growing up, having passed their 18th birthday. Rather than their "cutesy" concept in their previous album, the album has a more "mature" concept.

Commercial performance
Following the release of the album, "Grown Up" was an immediate success, taking first place on Taiwan's music chart, "G-Music", and other various music charts in mainland China. The album was responsible for 18 percent of all album sales in Taiwan during the week of April 9 to April 15 and was also the highest selling album for the same week for all Mandarin language album sales, with about 33 percent sales.

Track listing

References

2010 albums
By2 albums